The timeline of human evolution outlines the major events in the evolutionary lineage of the modern human species, Homo sapiens, 
throughout the history of life, beginning some 4 billion years ago down to recent evolution within H. sapiens during and since the Last Glacial Period.

It includes brief explanations of the various taxonomic ranks in the human lineage. The timeline reflects the  mainstream views in modern taxonomy, based on the principle of phylogenetic nomenclature;
in cases of open questions with no  clear consensus, the main competing possibilities are briefly outlined.

Overview of taxonomic ranks
A tabular overview of the taxonomic ranking   of Homo sapiens (with age estimates for each rank) is shown below.

Timeline

Unicellular life

Animalia

Chordata

Tetrapoda

Mammals

Primates

Hominidae

Homo

Homo sapiens

See also

 Evolution of human intelligence
 Graphical timeline of the universe
 Human evolution
 Recent human evolution
 List of human evolution fossils
 Natural history
 Human history
 History of Earth
 Timeline of prehistory
 Timeline of the evolutionary history of life
 List of timelines

References

External links
 Palaeos
 Hominid Timeline
 Berkeley Evolution
 History of Animal Evolution
 Tree of Life Web Project – explore complete phylogenetic tree interactively
 Human Timeline (Interactive) – Smithsonian, National Museum of Natural History (August 2016).

Human evolution
Evolution-related timelines